Dilemma inexpectatum is a minute species of deepwater cockle, a marine bivalve mollusc in the family Cardiidae.

References

Cardiidae
Molluscs of the Pacific Ocean
Bivalves of New Zealand
Molluscs described in 1966